The governor of Sint Maarten is the representative on Sint Maarten of the Dutch head of state (King Willem-Alexander). The governor's duties are twofold: he represents and guards the general interests of the kingdom and is head of the government of Sint Maarten. He is accountable to the government of the Kingdom of the Netherlands. As the head of the government, the governor is immune. The governor exercises the executive power under the responsibility of the ministers, who are responsible to the Estates of Sint Maarten. The governor does not have political responsibilities and is not part of the cabinet. During the formation of a cabinet the governor plays an important role. The governor is appointed by the monarch for a period of six years. This period can be prolonged for one more term of six years. The governor is supported by his secretariat the cabinet of the governor, and is advised by the Council of Advice (Raad van Advies), consisting of at least five members, appointed by the governor, advising him on the drafts of state ordinances, state decrees, kingdom acts and general administrative orders.

List of governors 

On 10 October 2010 Sint Maarten attained the status of a separate country within the Kingdom of the Netherlands (status aparte). Until the dissolution of the Netherlands Antilles, the governor of the Netherlands Antilles was also responsible for Sint Maarten. The first governor of Sint Maarten was Eugene Holiday.

See also 
 Kingdom of the Netherlands

References

External links 
 

Politics of Sint Maarten